"Goodbye Sam, Hello Samantha" is a song by Cliff Richard, released as a single in May 1970. It peaked at number 6 on the UK Singles Chart.

It was released as Richard's 50th single. However, Richard didn't like the song when he first heard it, but was persuaded by his manager Peter Gormley, who told him "you've got to take it away 'cause I'm sure it's going to be a hit". A German version, titled "Goodbye Sam (Das ist die Liebe)", was also released in Germany.

Track listings 
7": Columbia / DB 8685
 "Goodbye Sam, Hello Samantha" – 2:50
 "You Can Never Tell" – 2:21

7": Columbia / 1C 006-04 523 (Germany)
 "Goodbye Sam (Das ist die Liebe)" – 2:42
 "Kein Zug nach Gretna Green" – 3:29

Charts

References

1970 singles
1970 songs
Cliff Richard songs
Columbia Graphophone Company singles
Song recordings produced by Norrie Paramor
Songs written by Mitch Murray
Songs written by Peter Callander
Songs written by Geoff Stephens
Irish Singles Chart number-one singles